July 2015

See also

Death in custody
 Encounter killings by police (India)
List of American police officers killed in the line of duty
List of cases of police brutality
Lists of killings by law enforcement officers
Police brutality in the United States
Lynching in the United States

References 

 07
July 2015 events in the United States